Saint Wasnulf (or Vasnolfo, Wasnan, Wasnon, Wasnulphus, Wasnul; died  ) was a Scottish missionary in what is now Belgium.
His feast day is 1 October.

Monks of Ramsgate account

The monks of St Augustine's Abbey, Ramsgate wrote in their Book of Saints (1921),

Butler's account

The hagiographer Alban Butler (1710–1773) wrote in his Lives of the Fathers, Martyrs, and Other Principal Saints under May 26,

O'Hanlon's account

John O'Hanlon (1821–1905) in his Lives of the Irish saints wrote,

Notes

Citations

Sources

 
 
 

Medieval Scottish saints
650 deaths